Langham Hotel Boston is a luxury hotel in a historic building located at 250 Franklin Street in the financial district of Boston, Massachusetts. Constructed in 1922, with a 1953 addition, the architecturally significant structure was the first Federal Reserve Bank of Boston, and designated a Boston Landmark in 1978. In 2019 the hotel closed to undergo a complete renovation and re-opened its doors on June 30, 2021. The multimillion dollar renovation included all guestrooms, meeting space, two new restaurants, The Langham Club lounge, fitness center and indoor pool and all public areas.

The Langham Hotel Boston is a member of The Leading Hotels of the World and managed by Langham Hotels International.

History 
The Langham is a Renaissance Revival style building constructed in 1922 to house the Federal Reserve Bank of Boston. The building was designed by R. Clipston Sturgis based on the Palazzo della Cancelleria, in Rome, with its granite exterior, life-size equestrian statues, and painted dome ceiling.

Formerly the Governor's Reception room, The Wyeth Room contains two historic N. C. Wyeth murals. The Member's Court room contains a Norman B. Leventhal Map collection of historic Massachusetts maps. As the hotel was previously a bank, the ground floor has narrow windows to help discourage unwanted intruders. The original entry doors from Pearl Street still contain the gold coin moldings, and the bank vault is now used as a pastry kitchen.

Le Meridien Hotels managed the hotel from its opening in 1981 through December 31, 2003 when Langham Hotels assumed control.

Features
The Langham has 312 residentially styled guest rooms and suites, with Italian marble bathrooms, and two dining destinations: The Fed, a British-inspired cocktail pub with a New England twist, and GRANA, an Italian destination restaurant serving breakfast, lunch and weekend brunch. The hotel is home to a club lounge on the eighth floor overlooking Norman B. Leventhal Park and redesigned meeting space, including two ballrooms.

References

External links 

 
 

Government buildings completed in 1922
Hotels in Boston
Hotels established in 1981
1981 establishments in Massachusetts